Statistics of Liberian Premier League in season 1998.

Overview

Invincible Eleven won the championship.

References
Liberia – List of final tables (RSSSF)

Football competitions in Liberia
Lea